A front line (alternatively front-line or frontline) in military terminology is the position(s) closest to the area of conflict of an armed force's personnel and equipment, usually referring to land forces. When a front (an intentional or unintentional boundary) between opposing sides forms, the front line is the area where each side's forces are engaged in conflict. Leaders have often fought at the front lines either purposefully or due to a collapse in battle formation. While a calculated risk, fighting on the front has in instances reduced communication and heightened morale. The front is in direct contrast to the rear, which is the position farthest from conflict.

All branches of the United States Armed Forces use the related technical terms, Forward Line of Own Troops (FLOT) and Forward Edge of Battle Area (FEBA). These terms are used as battlespace control measures that designate the forward-most friendly maritime or land forces on the battlefield at a given point in time during an armed conflict.  FLOT/FEBA may include covering and screening forces. The Forward Line of Enemy Troops (FLET) is the FEBA from the enemy's perspective.

Etymology
Although the term "front line" first appeared in the 1520s, it was only in 1842 that it was recorded used in the military sense. Its first use as an adjective was from 1915.

The word "front" gained the military sense of "foremost part of an army" in the mid-14th century, which, in turn, led the word to take on the meaning "field of operations in contact with the enemy" in the 1660s. That sense led to the phrase home front, which first appeared in 1919. In a non-combat situation or when a combat situation is not assumed, front can mean the direction in which the command is faced.

The attributive adjective version of the term front line (as in "our front-line personnel") describes materiel or personnel intended for or actively in forward use: at sea, on land or in the air: at the front line.

Evolution of the concept
In the land campaigns of World War I, FEBAs, FLOTs and FLETs could often be identified by eye. For example, in France and Belgium they were defined by opposing defensive trench systems.

Typical modern conflicts are vastly different, characterised by "war amongst the people", the concept of a "Three Block War", and the presence of an asymmetric threat from irregular or terrorist combatants. In those cases, the concepts of front line, FEBA, FLOT and FLET may be of little relevance. The term "front line" has come to refer more to any place where bullets and bombs are flying or are likely to fly.

Military leaders who fought on the front line

 On September 10, 1941, Marshal Kliment Voroshilov personally led an attack on German tanks while armed with only a pistol; however, the attack was repelled and he was dismissed from his post.
 During the Battle of Stalingrad, general Viktor Zholudev fought with a submachine-gun beside his troops.
 Generalfeldmarschall Wolfram Freiherr von Richthofen frequently flew his unarmed Fieseler Fi 156 Storch plane over the front lines, sometimes directly over enemy positions to guide bomber strikes. On many occasions he was almost killed by enemy anti-aircraft fire. On rare occasions when he couldn't fly, he was personally in the front of advancing German tanks, guiding bomber strikes at enemy positions.
 After the Empire of Japan's official defeat in the Pacific War, Admiral Matome Ugaki participated in a kamikaze mission and was killed when his plane was shot down by anti-aircraft fire.
 General Roy Urquhart of the British Army 1st Airborne Division fought on the front lines in two engagements.

See also

References

External links

 Which way to the FEBA? , Maj John M. Fawcett, Jr., USAF, Airpower Journal

Land warfare